The Pilgrimage of Love (German: Der Liebe Pilgerfahrt) is a 1923 German silent drama film directed by Yakov Protazanov and starring Gustav von Wangenheim, Charlotte Ander and Wilhelm Diegelmann. It was shot at the Tempelhof Studios in Berlin. The film's sets were designed by the art director Jack Winter.

Cast
In alphabetical order
 Charlotte Ander as Enkelin Solveig 
 Paul Bildt as Maler Gundersen 
 Dall'orso as Sohn Graf Erik Hegermann-Lilienkrone 
 Wilhelm Diegelmann as Solveigs Großvater 
 Grete Diercks as Karin 
 Olga Engl as Gräfin Hegermann-Lilienkrone 
 Viktor Schwannecke as Oberlehrer Dr. Daniel Bornemann 
 Gustav von Wangenheim as Dr. Egil Rostrup

References

Bibliography
 Bock, Hans-Michael & Bergfelder, Tim. The Concise CineGraph. Encyclopedia of German Cinema. Berghahn Books, 2009.
 Grange, William. Cultural Chronicle of the Weimar Republic. Scarecrow Press, 2008.

External links

1923 films
Films of the Weimar Republic
Films directed by Yakov Protazanov
German silent feature films
German black-and-white films
UFA GmbH films
German drama films
1923 drama films
Silent drama films
1920s German films
Films shot at Tempelhof Studios